Mel Vogel (born 15 December 1848 Grand Duchy of Baden, present-day Germany) was a lawmaker who served in the California State Assembly for the 44th district from 1905 to 1909.

References

1848 births
Year of death unknown
Republican Party members of the California State Assembly